Canadian Commonwealth Games or Canadian British Empire Games may refer to:

1930 British Empire Games, in Hamilton, Ontario
1954 British Empire and Commonwealth Games, in Vancouver, B.C.
1978 Commonwealth Games, in Edmonton, Alberta
1994 Commonwealth Games, in Victoria, B.C.
Halifax bid for the 2014 Commonwealth Games
Commonwealth Games Canada
Canada at the Commonwealth Games

See also
 Canadian olympics (disambiguation)
 Canadian paralympics (disambiguation)
 Canadian Pan Am Games (disambiguation)